When He's Not a Stranger is a 1989 American Made for TV crime drama film directed by John Gray and starring Annabeth Gish and John Terlesky. The screenplay concerns a college freshman who is physically and sexually assaulted by a controlling football jock. It sums up the ordeal that rape victims experience and the sexual assault on college campuses. A stark dramatization of the "acquaintance rape" dilemma, it was originally to be broadcast on October 17, 1989, but pushed to November 6th of that year because of coverage surrounding the earthquakes in Northern California.

Plot
At Woodword University, a football-oriented California school, Lyn McKenna is raped by her best friend's abusive, controlling boyfriend, football player Ron Cooper.  Lyn is hesitant to reveal this information as she fears that doing so will create a number of social issues and will simply worsen the aftermath of her experience.  However, continued threats from Ron and his fellow football teammates lead Lyn into desperate action, and she requests that the school hold a disciplinary hearing against Ron, and ultimately demands that a district attorney prosecute.

Cast
Annabeth Gish ... Lyn McKenna
John Terlesky ... Ron Cooper
Kevin Dillon ... Rick
Kim Myers ... Melaine Fairchild
Stephen Elliott ... Attorney Foster
Paul Dooley ... Ben McKenna
Micole Mercurio ... Emily McKenna
Allan Arbus ...  Judge Thomas J. Gray
John M. Jackson ...  Woodward University Coach

External links

1989 films
1989 television films
1989 crime drama films
American crime drama films
American television films
Films scored by Mark Snow
Films directed by John Gray (director)
Films set in California
Films set in universities and colleges
Films about rape
Crime films based on actual events
1980s English-language films
1980s American films
Sexual assault in sports